SS-48, SS 48 or SS48 may refer to:

 BAP Pacocha (SS-48), a submarine of the Peruvian Navy which was received from the United States Navy in 1974, formerly known as the USS Atule (SS-403)
 USS L-8 (SS-48), a submarine of the United States Navy which saw service during World War I